James Islington (born ) is an Australian author best known for his high fantasy series The Licanius Trilogy.

Career
Prior to becoming a writer, Islington ran a tech startup. Though he always liked the idea of becoming an author, he only began writing seriously at the age of 30. Islington originally self-published The Shadow of What Was Lost in 2014. He signed a deal with Orbit Books less than a year later. He has published two sequel novels, entitled An Echo of Things to Come (2017) and The Light of All That Falls (2019). Islington stated that writing the second novel was much more stressful than writing his debut novel, in part because of the increased pressure that comes from being signed by a major publishing company.

The Shadow of What Was Lost received moderately positive reviews. Some critics praised the novel's complex magic, political intrigue, and large cast of characters, while others criticized the unoriginal premise while still complimenting the author's prose. The second book, An Echo of Things to Come, has received positive reviews which described it as a "dense, suspenseful adventure", as well as "gripping [yet] overelaborate".

Bibliography

The Licanius Trilogy
The Shadow of What Was Lost. (4 August 2014). Originally self-published, later Orbit Books. 
An Echo of Things to Come. (22 August 2018). Orbit. 
The Light of All That Falls. (10 December 2019). Orbit.

The Hierarchy
The Will of the Many (TBA)
The Strength of the Few (TBA)

Personal life
Islington was born and raised in Victoria, Australia. He and his wife live on the Mornington Peninsula. They have two children.

References

21st-century Australian male writers
Australian fantasy writers
Living people
Year of birth uncertain
Year of birth missing (living people)